Engelsburg (German for Angel's Castle) may refer to:
 the former name of Pokrzywno, Grudziądz County, Poland
 the former name of Kalbar, Queensland, Australia
 the German name for Castel Sant'Angelo, a historical building in Rome

See also
 Engelsberg (disambiguation)